Toto (est. in 1968 and stylised as TOTO) is a legalised form of lottery sold in Singapore, known by different names elsewhere. It is held by Singapore Pools, the only legal lottery operator in Singapore. As of April 2015, it was the second most popular type of gambling activity after 4-Digits. Toto can be purchased from any of the Singapore Pools outlets across Singapore. Draws are conducted every Monday and Thursday at 6:30 pm (SG time). In case of the cascade draw, the draw time will change to 9.30 pm. The "live" Toto draw can be viewed at the Singapore Pools Main Branch at 210 Middle Road. The profits from Toto go to the Singapore Totaliser Board (the owner of Singapore Pools) which uses the money for charity and other worthy causes.

History of Toto
Toto was established to control widespread illegal gambling in Singapore during the 1960s. A manual version of Toto was launched on 9 June 1968. In 1981, "snowballing" was introduced. It allowed the top prize to increase from draw to draw. The system entry mode is introduced so multiple bets can be made on a single coupon.

On 19 May 1986 Toto was offered as a computerised on-line game based on a '5 out-of 49' format. In 1988, the game was changed from a '5 out-of 49' format to a '6 out-of 42' format.  On 1 July 1997, Toto's format was changed once again to a '6 out-of 45' format.

The game introduced several popular draws, including the Toto Millennium Draw (30 December 1999), the Hongbao Draw (10 February 2000) and the Mooncake Draw (6 October 2006).

On 7 October 2014 Toto was changed to a '6 out-of 49' format. In September 2016, Toto became available online.

Method of Play
A buyer picks at least six numbers, from 1 to 49. The winning numbers drawn include six numbers plus an additional number.  Three or more winning numbers on a ticket matching the seven numbers drawn qualifies the buyer for a cash prize.  The prize money escalates with the increase in numbers matched.

The maximum allowed matching numbers is seven (with the winner winning both group 1 and group 2 of the draw – this can only happen if the person bought a ticket of system 7 and above).  Thus, if six numbers on the Toto ticket matches the six numbers drawn (apart from the additional number), the jackpot (Group 1) prize is won.

Placing of bets
There are 4 different ways to place bets:

Bet Slip

Bet Types 

The minimum bet amount is S$1.00 per bet ticket. Bets can also be placed by bet amounts.  The computer automatically sells the buyer the maximum number of bets for the bet type placed.  The balance amount is placed on the next lowest bet type.

Payout and odds

The odds of winning any prize are 1 in 54. 54% of the total Toto sales for each draw goes to the Toto prize pool. The Group 1 prize has a minimum guaranteed amount of $1 million. If there are no winners in one of the groups (excluding Group 5, 6 & 7), the respective group's prize will be snowballed to the next draw. Group 1 prizes can only be snowballed up to 4 draws, thereafter, the prize will be cascaded to Group 2.

See also
 Lottery
 National Council on Problem Gambling (Singapore)

References

Singaporean culture
Lottery games
Gambling in Singapore